Red Road is a 2006 psychological thriller film directed by Andrea Arnold and starring Kate Dickie, Tony Curran, Martin Compston, and Natalie Press. It tells the story of a CCTV security operator who observes through her monitors a man from her past. It is named after, and partly set at, the Red Road Flats in Balornock, Glasgow, Scotland, which were the tallest residential buildings in Europe at the time they were built. It was shot largely in a Dogme 95 style, using handheld cameras and natural light. The Observer polled several filmmakers and film critics who voted it as one of the best British films in the last 25 years.

Red Road is the first film in Advance Party, a projected trilogy following a set of rules dictating how the films will be written and directed. They will all be filmed and set in Scotland, using the same characters and cast. Each film will be made by a different first-time director.

Plot
Jackie Morrison works in Glasgow as a CCTV operator, monitoring the Red Road Flats. She lives alone and engages in occasional sex with married man Avery.

Jackie recognises a man she sees on the CCTV monitor and begins inquiring about him. It is revealed that he is Clyde Henderson, a prisoner who has been released early for good behaviour but will be back in prison immediately if he steps out of line. She begins stalking Clyde, tracking him on the CCTV monitors and gathering information about him. She follows Clyde to a cafe, and later learns he is throwing a party at the apartment he shares with fellow ex-con Stevie. She gains entry to the party and begins exchanging looks with a drunk Clyde. They dance, but she makes an excuse and runs out of the apartment.

After spotting Clyde on CCTV heading to a local bar, she goes there and sees him break up a fight between Stevie and another man. Stevie and his girlfriend return to Clyde's apartment, while Clyde initiates a conversation with Jackie before inviting her back to the apartment too. Clyde reveals he has a daughter, with whom he regrets he has lost contact. Clyde and Jackie have passionate sex, but she runs from the bedroom and stages rape, striking her face with a stone and fleeing from the apartment block in view of the CCTV cameras. The police identify Clyde as the rapist and Jackie watches the arrest on CCTV, and a few moments later sees Clyde's daughter approach the apartment block. Later, Stevie gains entry to Jackie's home and demands to know why she has falsely accused Clyde. Jackie reveals that Clyde killed her husband and daughter.

Jackie relents and tells the police she wishes to withdraw the accusation of rape. After Clyde's release, Jackie confronts him and they argue: Clyde describes the road traffic accident that killed Jackie's husband and daughter, and she reveals that her last words to her daughter were harsh. She tells Clyde that his daughter tried to reach him on the day of his arrest, and they go their separate ways.

Cast
 Kate Dickie as Jackie Morrison
 Tony Curran as Clyde Henderson
 Martin Compston as Stevie
 Natalie Press as April
 Paul Higgins as Avery

Production
The cunnilingus scene between Tony Curran and Kate Dickie is so convincing that many critics believed it to be real, such as Stephen Dalton in his article "Sealed With A Glasgow Kiss". The simulation was achieved simply, through placing half a pear between Dickie's legs, which Curran licked and sucked, and angling the camera so as to not reveal the machinations of the mimicry.

Reception

Critical response
On review-aggregating website Rotten Tomatoes, the film has a score of 88% based on 88 reviews, for an average rating of 7.3/10, the critical consensus stating: "Red Road director Andrea Arnold skillfully parses out just enough plot details at a time to keep the audience engrossed in this seductive thriller." On Metacritic, the film has a score of 73 out of 100 based on 18 critics, indicating "generally favorable reviews".

Accolades
 Cannes Film Festival 2006 – Jury Prize
 BAFTA Film Awards 2006 – Special Achievement by a British Director, Writer or Producer in their first Feature Film
 BAFTA Scotland Awards 2006 – Best Screenplay
 BAFTA Scotland Awards 2006 – Best Actress in a Scottish Film (Kate Dickie)
 BAFTA Scotland Awards 2006 – Best Actor in a Scottish Film (Tony Curran)
 BAFTA Scotland Awards 2006 – Best Director
 BAFTA Scotland Awards 2006 – Best Film
 British Independent Film Awards 2006 – Best Actress (Dickie)
 British Independent Film Awards 2006 – Best Actor (Curran)
 London Film Festival 2006 – Sutherland Trophy awarded to "the director of the most original and imaginative first feature film"

See also
 List of films featuring surveillance

References

External links
 
 
 British Films Catalogue
 Cannes director urges CCTV debate
 Interview with Andrea Arnold and Kate Dickie, Filmmaker Magazine Web Exclusives

2006 films
2006 independent films
2006 psychological thriller films
BBC Film films
British independent films
British psychological thriller films
Danish independent films
Danish thriller films
Films about security and surveillance
Films directed by Andrea Arnold
Films set in apartment buildings
Films set in Glasgow
Films shot in Glasgow
Scottish films
Springburn
Zentropa films
2006 directorial debut films
2000s English-language films
2000s British films